Studenec is a settlement in the Municipality of Sevnica in central Slovenia. The area is part of the historical region of Lower Carniola. The municipality is now included in the Lower Sava Statistical Region. 

The local parish church, built on a small hill to the southwest of the settlement core, is dedicated to the Immaculate Conception and belongs to the Roman Catholic Diocese of Novo Mesto. It is a medieval building that was restyled in the Baroque in the second quarter of the 18th century. The churches in Rovišče and Primož are under the jurisdiction of the Parish of Studenec.

References

External links
Studenec at Geopedia

Populated places in the Municipality of Sevnica